Gold Gang Records Inc. is a Georgia-based record label  founded in Atlanta by Trinidad James in 2012.

History 
James' debut single, "All Gold Everything", has charted on the Billboard Hot 100 and R&B/Hip Hop charts. It is taken from his debut mixtape, Don't Be S.A.F.E. (Sensitive As Fuck Everyday), originally released on July 31, 2012, and officially re-released with a music video on October 16, 2012. On December 13, 2012, it was announced that James had signed a joint venture with Def Jam Records for approximately $2 million. In January, Def Jam released Don't Be S.A.F.E to iTunes, which included the official remix of "All Gold Everything" featuring 2 Chainz, T.I, and Young Jeezy.

On August 6, 2013, he announced he would be releasing his second mixtape, 10 PC Mild, on August 13. After months of not releasing music, James announced that he had been dropped from Def Jam on August 1, 2014. He also stated that the album he planned to release on the label will now be released for free, and that producers and rappers who contributed to the project should not expect any compensation because he has "no money".

August 11, 2014, Trinidad James released a single with his recording artist 31, "No Excuses", which was new music since being dropped from Def Jam. On December 31, 2015, recording artist 31 released his mixtape, "Scale Tales" during a release party at the "Department Store" in Atlanta. As of April 1, 2015, "Scale Tales" has over 24,000 views on livemixtapes.com.

On January 8, 2015, Gold Gang Records recording artist 31 debuted his recording label Grammy Society along with his members Kwame, Greg Hadley, and High Defynition.

Artists

None

Current acts

Discography

See also 
 List of record labels

References

External links 
 
 

Record labels established in 2012
American independent record labels
Companies based in Atlanta
2012 establishments in Georgia (U.S. state)